Stephanie Moller is an American sociologist who is Professor of Sociology at the University of North Carolina at Charlotte.

Career
After receiving her Ph.D. from the University of North Carolina at Chapel Hill in 2003, Moller joined the faculty of the University of North Carolina at Charlotte in 2003 as an assistant professor of sociology. She left the university in 2008 to work in Brand and Advertising Research at Bank of America.  Moller returned to the University of North Carolina at Charlotte August 2019.  She was named full professor and department chair in 2014.  She served as chair until 2019 when she transitioned to the Director of the Public Policy Doctoral Program.  In 2022, she retired from administration and returned to a faculty position as Professor of Sociology and Public Policy at the University of North Carolina at Charlotte  Also in 2014, she became editor-in-chief of Social Science Research. She continues to serve as co-editor-in-chief, along with Dr. Yang Cao of the University of North Carolina at Charlotte.

References

External links
Faculty page

Living people
Academic journal editors
American sociologists
American women sociologists
University of North Carolina at Charlotte faculty
American women social scientists
Guilford College alumni
University of Delaware alumni
University of Georgia alumni
University of North Carolina at Chapel Hill alumni
Year of birth missing (living people)
21st-century American women